National School of Elocution and Oratory (later, Shoemaker School of Speech and Drama) was an American school for speech arts, focused on rhetoric and elocution. It was established by Jacob and Rachel H. Shoemaker in Philadelphia, 1873. Attention was given to conversation and oratory, vocal culture, reading, and recitation. It awarded Bachelor's and master's degrees. From 1915, their daughter, Dora Adele Shoemaker, served as principal, renaming the school "Shoemaker School of Speech and Drama" and adding coursework in journalism and radio technique. The school closed in the late 1930s.

History
Professor Jacob W. Shoemaker (1842–1880) studied of the principles of rhetoric and elocution, taught these extensively in institutes throughout Pennsylvania, and from 1866, labored in Philadelphia to build up a school that should embody and present these principles with full effect. His enthusiasm and persistence gradually attracted enough pupils and assistants to enable him to carry out his plans, and in the autumn of 1873, the National School of Elocution and Oratory was established. In 1874, its first catalogue was issued, showing an enrolment of 88 students for that year. In 1875, its scope and course were much extended, and a charter was secured for it from the legislature of the State. By September 1880, it was said that not less than 3,000 students came under its instruction, and that at least 600 lectures and readings were given before educational bodies and lyceums.

Prof. Shoemaker died in 1880, and the institution was carried on for several years under the direction of his widow, Mrs. Shoemaker, who had previously acted as an assistant teacher. In 1886, she was vice-president, the Presidency having been accepted by Dr. Edward Brooks, formerly Principal of the State Normal School at Millersville (now Millersville University of Pennsylvania).

From 1915, Dora Adele Shoemaker served as principal. Renamed the Shoemaker School of Speech and Drama, its course offerings included journalism and radio technique. Dora headed the school until the late 1930s.

Notable alumni
 Joseph Elijah Armstrong, politician
 Maud Babcock, educator
 Anna Braden, author, newspaper editor
 Martha Hughes Cannon, politician, physician
 John O. Crosby, educator
 Cora Smith Eaton, suffragist, physician and mountaineer
 Sarah McGehee Isom, orator, educator

Selected works
 The Elocutionist's Annual.-Philadelphia, The National School of Oratory.
 Lillle People's Speaker.-Philadelphia, The National School of Oratory.
 Young Folks' Dialogues.-Philadelphia, The National School of Oratory.
 Young Folks' Entertainments.—By E. C. and L. J. Rook. Philadelphia, The National School of Oratory.
 Choice Humor: -For reading and recitation.—Philadelphia, The National School of Oratory.
 Practical Elocution.-By J. W. Shoemaker. Philadelphia, National School of Elocution and Oratory.
 Young Folks' Speaker.-Compiled by Mrs. J. W. Shoemaker. Philadelphia, Publication Department National School of Oratory.
 Dialogues.-Designed for school and social entertainment, entirely new and original. Edited by Mrs. J. W. Shoemaker. Philadelpbia, National School of Elocution and Oratory.

References

Defunct universities and colleges in Philadelphia
1873 establishments in Pennsylvania
1930s disestablishments in Pennsylvania
Defunct schools of the performing arts in the United States
Performing arts education in the United States